Henry Walsh may refer to:

 Henry Walsh (cricketer) (born 1993), New Zealand cricketer
 Henry A. Walsh, American priest of the Archdiocese of Boston
 Henry A. Walsh (architect), American architect of Cathedral of the Most Blessed Sacrament
 Henry Alfred Walsh, Companion of the Order of the Bath in 1905 (1905 Birthday Honours)
 Henry Collins Walsh (1863–1927), founder of The Explorers Club in 1904
 Henry Sallows Walsh, Australian politician, mayor of Melbourne in 1858
 Henry Walsh, mayor of Waterford in 1556
 John Henry Walsh ('Stonehenge') (1810–1888), writer on sport

See also